During the closing ceremony in Vancouver, the 82 nations selected one member of their delegation to be the flagbearer. Some countries for example, Albania chose the same athlete (Erjon Tola) as the opening ceremony. On the other hand, some countries such as Algeria had already left the Olympic village, and therefore had its NOC assistant carry the flag.

Countries and flagbearers
Below is a list of all parading countries with their announced flag bearer, sorted in the order in which they appeared in the parade. This is sortable by country name under which they entered, the flag bearer's name, or the flag bearer's sport. Names are given as were officially designated by the International Olympic Committee (IOC).

References

2010 Winter Olympics
Lists of Olympic flag bearers